Icuria is a genus of flowering plants belonging to the family Fabaceae.

Its native range is Mozambique.

Species:
 Icuria dunensis Wieringa

References

Fabaceae
Fabaceae genera